This is a list of the mountains of the Falkland Islands

 Jack's Mountain
 Mount Adam
 Mount Challenger
 Mount Edgeworth
 Mount Emery
 Mount Harriet
 Mount Kent
 Mount Longdon
 Mount Low
 Mount Maria
 Mount Moody
 Mount Robinson
 Mount Simon
 Mount Sulivan
 Mount Tumbledown
 Mount Usborne
 Mount Wickham
 Mount Young
 Smoko Mount
 Wireless Ridge

Mountains
Falkland Islands